Rafał Włodarczyk (born 26 January 1995) is a Polish footballer who plays as a midfielder for .

Career

Club career

Włodarczyk started his career with Polish fourth division side . In 2014, Włodarczyk was sent on loan to Ząbkovia Ząbki in the Polish second division from German Bundesliga club Hertha BSC, where he made 5 league appearances and scored 0 goals. On 15 November 2014, he debuted for Ząbkovia Ząbki during a 0-1 loss to GKS Tychy.

Before the second half of 2015–16,  Włodarczyk signed for Znicz Pruszków in the Polish third division, helping them earn promotion to the Polish second division. Before the second half of 2017–18, he signed for Polish fifth division team , helping them earn promotion to the Polish fourth division.

International career

He represented Poland at the 2012 UEFA European Under-17 Championship, helping them achieve third place.

References

External links
 

Polish footballers
Expatriate footballers in Germany
Hertha BSC players
Living people
Association football midfielders
1995 births
Polish expatriate sportspeople in Germany
Polish expatriate footballers
I liga players
II liga players
III liga players
Ząbkovia Ząbki players
Znicz Pruszków players
Olimpia Zambrów players
People from Pruszków
Poland youth international footballers